New Kids on the Block is an animated television series featuring the adventures of the New Kids on the Block. It lasted a season from 1990 on ABC. Beginning the following year, it aired in reruns from October 12, 1991 to 1993 on The Disney Channel.

Though the group appeared in live action clips, their animated voices were performed by other voice actors. "You Got It (The Right Stuff)" was the opening theme, while an instrumental version of "Step by Step" was the closing theme.

In each episode, the group is traveling to a concert location when something takes them off track, ending in a pro-social moral lesson.

A primetime special, New Kids on the Block Christmas Special, aired on ABC on December 14, 1990.

Plot
The series focuses on the group's misadventures along with their managers, who are based on their real-life manager, Maurice Starr.

Episodes
 "The New Kid in the Class" (September 8, 1990)
 "Sheik of My Dreams" (September 15, 1990)
 "In Step... Out of Time!" (September 22, 1990)
 "Cowa-BONK-a" (September 29, 1990)
 "Kissed, Missed, and Double D'ist"
 "D'ist Dream Date"
 "Hot Dog!"
 "Overnight Success"
 "The Legend of the Sandman" (November 19, 1990)
 "Homeboys on the Range"
 "New Heroes on the Block"
 "The New Kids on the Old Block"
 "The New Kids Off the Wall"
 "Rewind Time"
 "Christmas Special" (December 14, 1990, NOTE: This episode aired on prime time, not Saturday morning)

Principal cast

 David Coburn - Donnie Wahlberg/Nikko the dog
 Brian Stokes Mitchell - Danny Wood
 Loren Lester - Jordan Knight
 Scott Menville - Joey McIntyre
 Matt E. Mixer - Jonathan Knight
 Dave Fennoy - Dick Scott
 Pat Fraley - Hubbie
 J.D. Hall - Biscuit
 Josh Keaton - Albert
 Theresa Saldana - Rosa

Additional voices
 Patricia Alice Albrecht - 
 Bobby Block - 
 Susan Blu - 
 Thom Bray - 

 Hamilton Camp - 
 Jennifer Darling - 
 Linda Gary - 
 Gaille Heidemann - Reporter
 Michael Horse - 
 Clyde Kusatsu - 
 Sherry Lynn - 
 Kenneth Mars - 
 Pat Musick - 
 Samantha Paris - 
 Rob Paulsen - 
 Maggie Roswell - 
 Leslie Speights - 
 Cree Summer - Stevie
 Susan Ware - 
 Michael Winslow -

Crew
 Susan Blu - Voice Director

VHS releases

References

External links
 

1990 American television series debuts
1990 American television series endings
American children's animated adventure television series
American children's animated musical television series
American television series with live action and animation
1990s American animated television series
Animated musical groups
American Broadcasting Company original programming
New Kids on the Block
Television series by DIC Entertainment
Television series by DHX Media
Animation based on real people
Television series based on singers and musicians